Senator Clarke may refer to:

Members of the United States Senate
James Paul Clarke (1854–1916), U.S. Senator from Arkansas from 1903 to 1916
John Hopkins Clarke (1789–1870), U.S. Senator from Rhode Island from 1847 to 1853

United States state senate members
Archibald S. Clarke (1788–1821), New York State Senate
Eugene Clarke (born 1956), Mississippi State Senate
Frank Gay Clarke (1850–1901), New Hampshire State Senate
George L. Clarke (1813–1890), Rhode Island State Senate
George W. Clarke (Washington politician) (1906–2006), Washington State Senate
Hansen Clarke (born 1957), Michigan State Senate
James M. Clarke (1917–1999), North Carolina State Senate
John Blades Clarke (1833–1911), Kentucky State Senate
John Jones Clarke (1803–1887), Massachusetts State Senate
John Clarke (Michigan politician) (1797–1876), Michigan State Senate
Kathryn Clarke (politician) (1873–1940), Oregon State Senate
S. D. Clarke (1881–1966), Florida State Senate
Terrel E. Clarke (1920–1997), Illinois State Senate